Unitarian Memorial Church is a historic church on 102 Green Street in Fairhaven, Massachusetts, home to the Unitarian Universalist Society of Fairhaven.

The congregation was founded in 1819, moved into the Washington Street Christian Meetinghouse in 1832, and called its first minister in 1840.  The Reverend Jordinn Nelson Long is its currently serving minister, and the Society President is Lawrence DeSalvatore. UUSF is a member congregation of the Boston-based Unitarian Universalist Association, and a designated GLBTQA Welcoming Congregation, a UUA Honor Congregation, and a part of the Green Sanctuary movement.  Services are held in the neo-Gothic sanctuary at 10:30 a.m. from September through mid-June each year.  The church was added to the National Register of Historic Places in 1996.

The Unitarian Memorial Church in Fairhaven was built, financed and donated to the Unitarians in 1904 by Henry H. Rogers in memory of his mother, Mary Eldredge Huttleston. The church was designed by Boston architect Charles Brigham in a Gothic Revival style.  It is one hundred fourteen feet (34.75m) in height, one hundred feet (30.48m) long in body and fifty-three feet (16.15m) wide. The nave is thirty-two feet (9.75m) wide and seventy-one feet (21.64m) long. The main aisle is sixty-two feet (18.90m) long and six feet (1.83m) wide.  The church, parish house and former parsonage (now Harrop Center) of the Unitarian Society are so placed as to form three sides of a quadrangle, set among well-kept lawns and shrubbery.  Granite (locally quarried) with Indiana limestone decorative carvings dominate the exterior while marble and limestone carvings dominate the interior. All stonework artistry was created by forty-five Italian craftsmen brought to Fairhaven by Rogers.

Sanctuary 

All the woodwork in the sanctuary is English bog oak carved by forty-five Bavarian craftsmen. No two carvings are alike on the thirty-two pews, the ornate pulpit, the organ pipe cases, the choir screen or the doors.
In the rafters above the pews are ten wooden angels covered in beaten gold. Each ten-foot-high angel holds articles and bear inscriptions symbolizing ten attributes of the intellectual life.
The south entrance has twelve bronze symbols of the zodiac inlaid in the marble floor.

Tower 

The great tower, over one hundred and sixty-five feet (50.29m) high, of sparkling granite and carved limestone, is a landmark for many miles. There are one hundred eighty granite steps leading to the tower. In this tower is a finely adjusted D Chime of eleven bells. They weigh a total of 14,000 pounds (6350 kg) and are played (struck) by iron hammers. The bells were cast by Chester Meneelly of the Meneelly Bell Company of Troy, New York. The original ringer's gallery is still in the tower even though the bells are now played both by hand or electronically from a small room in the sanctuary.

Bronze doors 

At the south entrance to the sanctuary are the great bronze doors, extremely rich in design, each leaf is solid bronze weighing 2 1/4 tons. Following the Gothic outline of each leaf is a series of niches. Those on the exterior are canopied, each containing a finely modeled figure nine inches (22.9 cm) high. The thirty-eight statues represent great characters in the history of Christianity, covering a period of nineteen centuries.

Baptismal font 

From the cloister with its ornate bronze gates and marble mosaic floor we enter the foyer with the baptismal font. The font sits on elegant white Indian marble inlaid with bronze lettering. Over the font hangs a large oak canopy carved by Johannes Kirchmayer with ten angels each holding a scroll engraved with one of the Ten Commandments. Above them are ten standing figures of men who preached and spread Christianity throughout the world.
Below the majestic vaulted ceiling in four corners are stone carvings symbolizing the four stages of womanhood: Infant, Youth, Maturity and Old Age. The beautiful bronze medallions inlaid in the marble floor represent Matthew, Mark, Luke and John.

Organ 
The organ was built by the Hutchings-Votey Organ Company of Boston, Massachusetts in 1904. With 2,300 pipes (24 ranks) distributed over 3 manuals and pedalboard, it was considered one of the finest organs in the country at the time. When the new hot-air heating system installed in 1968 ruined the Hutchings-Votey pneumatic mechanism, a new organ was built by the Roche Organ Co., of Taunton, Massachusetts, in 1971 as their Opus 10. The Roche Organ Company preserved the exterior casework and the twelve best ranks from the previous organ, increasing the number of ranks to 58, with 3,163 pipes and fifty speaking registers.

The organ occupies the transepts on either side of the chancel and is housed behind the richly carved twin cases of the original instrument, which differ from each other in detail of ornamentation. The console is centrally located in the choir loft behind the pulpit rostrum. The woodwork of the cases, like the rest of the church furnishings, is of English oak. The facade pipes are covered in gold leaf and embellished with elaborate diapering. The basic case design bears a strong resemblance to that of the 1896 organ case in Southwark Cathedral in England (which probably inspired the Fairhaven design), although the Southwark case is not nearly as attractive nor as elaborate.

A digital upgrade of the console was accomplished by Barry Turley in 2008. Today, the organ remains among the finest of its size. All of the ornamental pipes in the two organ cases, one on each side of the chancel, are covered in beaten gold, the color of clouded silver, and are decorated very ornately.

Stained-glass windows 

The stained-glass windows are the work of American Impressionist artist, Robert Reid. They cover the theme of the birth of Jesus in the Memorial Window utilizing color and shading from cool blues to warm earth tones through the nine clerestory windows from East to West. Seven of these windows are titled with one of the Beatitudes (or Blessed Be's) which Jesus was teaching his Disciples as illuminated in the glorious twenty-four-foot-high Sermon-on-the-Mount window located on the west wall.
One notable effect of the windows is the natural flesh quality in the figures. Two years were spent in their design and execution. These stained-glass windows were Reid's most prized work, a masterpiece set and his only effort in stained glass.

See also
National Register of Historic Places listings in Bristol County, Massachusetts

References

Unitarian Universalist churches in Massachusetts
Churches on the National Register of Historic Places in Massachusetts
Churches in Bristol County, Massachusetts
Stone churches in Massachusetts
Fairhaven, Massachusetts
National Register of Historic Places in Bristol County, Massachusetts
Granite buildings
Limestone churches in the United States